Cyril Graham Primmer (19 April 1924 – 1 November 2003) was an Australian politician. Born in Warrnambool, Victoria, he was educated at state schools before becoming a dairy farmer at Koroit. He served in the military 1943–1945, and was a member of Belfast Shire Council. In 1970, he was elected to the Australian Senate as a Labor Senator for Victoria. He remained in the Senate until his retirement in 1985.

Primmer died in Warrnambool in 2003.

References

1924 births
2003 deaths
Australian Labor Party members of the Parliament of Australia
Members of the Australian Senate for Victoria
Members of the Australian Senate
People from Warrnambool
20th-century Australian politicians